The  1935 German football championship, the 28th edition of the competition, was won by Schalke 04 by defeating VfB Stuttgart 6–4 in the final. It was Schalke's second consecutive championship and second overall, with four more titles to follow until 1942 and a seventh one in 1958. For Stuttgart it was the club's first appearance in the final, with three more to follow between 1950 and 1953.

The 1935 final produced the most goals scored in a final during the history of the competition, exceeding the nine scored in the 1903 and 1930 final. Schalke's Ernst Poertgen became the 1935 championship's top scorer with eleven goals.

The sixteen 1934–35 Gauliga champions competed in a group stage of four groups of four teams each, with the group winners advancing to the semi-finals. The two semi-final winners then contested the 1935 championship final.

Qualified teams
The teams qualified through the 1934–35 Gauliga season:

Competition

Group 1
Group 1 was contested by the champions of the Gauligas Brandenburg, Ostpreußen, Sachsen and Schlesien:

Group 2
Group 2 was contested by the champions of the Gauligas Nordmark, Niedersachsen, Pommern and Westfalen:

Group 3
Group 3 was contested by the champions of the Gauligas Baden, Mittelrhein, Niederrhein and Südwest:

Group 4
Group 4 was contested by the champions of the Gauligas Bayern, Hessen, Mitte and Württemberg:

Semi-finals

|align="center" style="background:#ddffdd" colspan=3|2 June 1935

|}

Final

|align="center" style="background:#ddffdd" colspan=3|23 June 1935

|}

References

Sources
 kicker Allmanach 1990, by kicker, page 164 & 177 - German championship

External links
 German Championship 1934–35 at weltfussball.de 
 German Championship 1935 at RSSSF

1
German
German football championship seasons